Eden Prairie High School (EPHS) (formerly Eden Prairie Senior High School) is a four-year public high school in Eden Prairie, Minnesota, United States established in 1923. The present high school opened in 1981 and was significantly added to in 1990, 1994 and 1997. It was named a Blue Ribbon School of Excellence in 1996 by the United States Department of Education. Eden Prairie High School is accredited by the North Central Association of Colleges and Secondary Schools and the Minnesota Department of Education.

Demographics
With 2,804 students, Eden Prairie High School was the third largest high school in Minnesota by enrollment in 2017–18. In the 2010–11 school year, 79% of students were White, 9% were African American, 8% were Asian, and 4% were Hispanic. In 2016–2017 school year, 67% of students were white, 11% were African American, 7% were Hispanic, 12% were Asian, and 3% were of two or more races.

Academics 
The high school offers over 425 courses, many of which are electives. Language courses include Spanish, French, Sign Language, German and Chinese. Class size ranges from 29 to 34 students.

Facilities

The school is divided into four wings on three floors. The North Wing is home to the auditorium, Performing Arts Center (PAC), Main Gym, small gym, machine shops, music classrooms and EagleVision television studios. The South Wing contains the Old Commons lunch room, science classrooms and labs, foreign language classrooms, a photography lab, and Special Services facilities. In the East Wing are the New or East Commons lunch room, math classrooms, social studies classrooms, and English classrooms. The West Wing is home of the business classrooms, technology classrooms and labs, health classrooms and economic classrooms. Each department has a resource center near the specific classrooms so that students can work near their teachers when necessary.

Student activities

Student activities include fine arts; academic teams such as Quiz Bowl, Knowledge Bowl, and Future Problem Solvers; Team 2502, a robotics team; a variety of clubs, including the Eyrie newspaper and eagLIT literary magazine; and both varsity and intramural sports. Eden Prairie boasts a wide variety of extracurricular activities including Band, Ceramics Sculpture, Chess Team, Chorus, Computer Arts, Dance, Drawing Painting, Orchestra, Math Team, Photography, Theater Drama, Bible Study, and Video Film Production.

Athletics

Eden Prairie High School is a member of the Lake Conference in the Minnesota State High School League. In 2006, the football team was ranked by MaxPreps as the No. 11 team in the nation following a win in the 2006 State Championship. In 2007, Sports Illustrated named Eden Prairie the top high school athletic program in Minnesota. The high school was also recognized by Sports Illustrated as one of the Top Ten Athletic Programs in 2008–09. In the 2001–02 school year, Eden Prairie's athletic budget was $1,460,433, the highest per capita of any high school in Minnesota. Eden Prairie is the only high school in Minnesota to send a team (pom squad) to the UDA National Dance Team Championship, where they have claimed seven national titles (1996, 2002, 2004, 2006, 2009, 2010, 2011)..

The 1999 state championship resulted in a tie between Eden Prairie High School and Edina High School.
 The Minnesota State High School League's first lacrosse tournaments for boys and girls were held in 2007. Prior to that year lacrosse was a U.S. Lacrosse Association certified club sport.

Notable alumni
Adam Bartley – actor
David Baszucki – Roblox co-founder
Rachel Bootsma – Olympic gold medalist swimmer
 Carter Bykowski – professional football player
Blake Cashman – professional football player
 Ryan Connelly – professional football player
 Carter Coughlin - professional football player
 Cole De Vries – professional baseball player
Jay Foreman – professional football player
Jermaine Johnson II - professional football player
Nick Leddy – professional ice hockey player
Casey Mittelstadt – professional ice hockey player
Lúcia Moniz – Portuguese singer who attended as an exchange student
Susan Rapp – Olympic swimmer
Nick Seeler – professional ice hockey player
 Robert Rudolph Remus, retired professional wrestler known as Sgt. Slaughter –  
Neil Wagner – professional baseball player
Antoine Winfield Jr. - Professional football player
Ryan Wittman – basketball player
Ethan Wragge – basketball player

References

External links
 
 EPHS Parent Teacher Organization (PTO)
 EPHS Boosters Association
 Foundation for Eden Prairie Schools - alumni association

Educational institutions established in 1981
Public high schools in Minnesota
Eden Prairie, Minnesota
Schools in Hennepin County, Minnesota
1981 establishments in Minnesota